A Pain in the Pullman is a 1936 short subject directed by Preston Black starring American slapstick comedy team The Three Stooges (Moe Howard, Larry Fine and Curly Howard). It is the 16th entry in the series released by Columbia Pictures starring the comedians, who released 190 shorts for the studio between 1934 and 1959.

Plot
The Stooges are small-time actors traveling by train to an engagement—and fleeing the landlady for their unpaid rent. They are told to put their pet monkey, Joe, in the baggage car, but are afraid he will get hurt. The baggage car door closes before they can get Joe in there, so they sneak Joe onto the Southern Pacific train with them. Joe eventually gets loose, and they have a hard time finding him and also getting up to their berth. They wind up making a lot of noises, and disturbing all of the train's passengers, including Paul Payne (James C. Morton) and Mr. Johnson, the stage manager and boss (Bud Jamison), the latter of which routinely hits his head on the upper berth upon awakening. Ultimately, a terrified Joe pulls the train's emergency cord, abruptly stopping the train in the process. And so the angry passengers, Paul Payne, Mr. Johnson and the angry conductor (Eddie Laughton) then forcibly threw the Stooges from the train and they hobble away into the night on three cows because they were fired for making a lot of noises and for bringing their pet monkey onto the train.

Production notes
A Pain in the Pullman is the longest short film the Stooges made at Columbia Pictures, running at 19 minutes, 46 seconds; the shortest is Sappy Bull Fighters, running at 15 minutes, 19 seconds. Filming was completed between April 29 and May 4, 1936.

This is the first short in which Moe, Larry, and Curly are actually referred to as "The Three Stooges" in the dialogue.

The closing shot of the Stooges leaping over a bush, and landing on a trio of bucking steers was reused at the end of A Ducking They Did Go. The same gag was used in the end of The Ren and Stimpy Show episode "Rubber Nipple Salesmen" (show creator John Kricfalusi was apparently a big fan of the Three Stooges, using a good number of Stooge gags as part of his tenure with Ren and Stimpy; the character of Stimpy is himself based on Larry).

The plot device of performers traveling via rail and enduring sleeping hardships was previously used by Laurel and Hardy in 1929's Berth Marks. Female comedy team ZaSu Pitts and Thelma Todd also borrowed the plot device for their 1932 short Show Business (directed by Jules White). Gus Schilling and Richard Lane remade the film in 1947 as Training for Trouble.

The name "Johnson" was shouted a total number of 10 times.

Shellfish
Moe Howard had fond memories of filming A Pain in the Pullman. In his autobiography Moe Howard and the Three Stooges, he specifically recalled his intense dislike for shellfish, and how brother Curly Howard cut the inside of his mouth eating the shells from a Dungeness crab:

References

External links
 
 
A Pain in the Pullman at threestooges.net

1936 films
1936 comedy films
American black-and-white films
Rail transport films
Fiction about rail transport
The Three Stooges films
Columbia Pictures short films
American slapstick comedy films
1930s English-language films
1930s American films